Hans Zehetmayer (born April 28, 1909, date of death unknown) was an Austrian boxer who competed in the 1936 Summer Olympics.

In 1936 he was eliminated in the second round of the middleweight class after losing his fight to the upcoming bronze medalist Raúl Villarreal.

External links
Hans Zehetmayer's profile at Sports Reference.com

1909 births
Year of death missing
Middleweight boxers
Olympic boxers of Austria
Boxers at the 1936 Summer Olympics
Austrian male boxers
20th-century Austrian people